The Sanjak of Smederevo, also known in historiography as the Pashalik of Belgrade, was an Ottoman administrative unit (sanjak), that existed between the 15th and the outset of the 19th centuries. It was located in the territory of present-day Central Serbia, Serbia.

Administration

Eyalet belonging
The sanjak belonged to Rumelia Eyalet between 1459 and 1541, and again between 1716 and 1717 and again 1739 and 1817 (nominally to 1830), to Budin Eyalet between 1541 and 1686, and to Temeșvar Eyalet between 1686 and 1688 and again between 1690 and 1716.

Borders
During the governorship of Hadji Mustafa Pasha (1793–1801), the administration was expanded eastwards to include the Kladovo area, until then part of the Sanjak of Vidin.

History

15th century
The Sanjak of Smederevo was formed after the fall of the Serbian Despotate in 1459, and its administrative seat was Smederevo. Ottoman sources note a migration of "Vlachs" (pastoralists) to the Sanjak of Smederevo and parts of the Sanjak of Kruševac and Sanjak of Vidin; in 1476 there were 7,600 Vlach households and 15,000 peasant households. In the 1470s,  because of the fighting with the Hungarians many areas in northern Serbia were deserted. Ottomans start colonize that area with Vlachs as a military element, and this colonization includes entire territory of the Sanjak of Smederevo, most of Sanjak of Kruševac and Vidin. Vlachs to that area coming from Bosnia, Herzegovina, Montenegro and from  Stari Vlah (İstari Eflak) region in the southwestern Serbia.

16th century
After the Ottoman Empire conquered Belgrade in 1521, the administrative seat of the Sanjak was moved to this city. In this period when the Battle of Mohács took place the sanjakbey of Smederevo was Kučuk Bali-beg. Ottoman campaigns against Hungary in 16th century reduced part of the population which migrated to the Hungarian territory, according to  tax registrations from 1476 and 1516 about 17% villages were abandoned. Ottoman  resettle abandoned lands with populations from neighboring district which were mostly semi-nomadic Vlach groups from area of Bosnia, Hercegovina, Montenegro, and Stari Vlah in Serbia. Vlachs made up 15% of the population in Smederevo in 1516. According to Noel Malcolm in Ottoman defters from 16th century, in Smederevo area there were about 82,000 of mostly Vlach families. Benedikt Kuri-pečič in the 16th century noted that  (Orthodox) Serbs "who call themselves Vlachs" moved from Smederevo and Belgrade to Bosnia and are part of three peoples inhabiting Bosnia alongside (Muslim) "Turks" and (Catholic) old Bosniaks.

18th century

The Sanjak was occupied by the Habsburg monarchy as the Kingdom of Serbia (1718–39), however, with the Treaty of Belgrade, the area was ceded to the Ottoman Empire. Belgrade, the center of the region while under Austrian rule, was neglected under the Ottomans and Smederevo (Semendire) was the administrative center. Nevertheless, Belgrade eventually became the seat of a pasha with the title of vizier and the Sanjak began to be referred to as the Pashaluk of Belgrade, although it was still called the Sanjak of Smederevo in official documents.

In 1788, Koča's frontier rebellion saw eastern Šumadija occupied by Austrian Serbian freikorps and hajduks. From 1788–91, Belgrade was again under Austrian rule after Koča's rebellion. The Siege of Belgrade from 15 September to 8 October 1789, a Habsburg Austrian force besieged the fortress of Belgrade. The Austrians held the city until 1791 when it handed Belgrade back to the Ottomans according to the terms of the Treaty of Sistova.

In 1793 and 1796 Sultan Selim III proclaimed firmans which gave more rights to Serbs. Among other things, taxes were to be collected by the obor-knez (dukes); freedom of trade and religion were granted and there was peace. Selim III also decreed that some unpopular janissaries were to leave the Belgrade Pashaluk as he saw them as a threat to the central authority of Hadji Mustafa Pasha. Many of those janissaries were employed by or found refuge with Osman Pazvantoğlu, a renegade opponent of Sultan Selim III in the Sanjak of Vidin. Fearing the dissolution of the Janissary command in the Sanjak of Smederevo, Osman Pazvantoğlu launched a series of raids against Serbians without the permission of Sultan Selim III, causing much volatility and fear in the region. Pazvantoğlu was defeated in 1793 by the Serbs at the Battle of Kolari.

In the summer of 1797 the sultan appointed Mustafa Pasha on position of beglerbeg of Rumelia Eyalet and he left Serbia for Plovdiv to fight against the Vidin rebels of Pazvantoğlu. During the absence of Mustafa Pasha, the forces of Pazvantoğlu captured Požarevac and besieged the Belgrade fortress. At the end of November 1797 obor-knezes Aleksa Nenadović, Ilija Birčanin and Nikola Grbović from Valjevo brought their forces to Belgrade and forced the besieging janissary forces to retreat to Smederevo. By 1799 the janissary corps had returned, as they were pardoned by Sultan's decree, and they immediately suspended the Serbian autonomy and drastically increased taxes, enforcing martial law in Serbia.

On 15 December 1801, the popular Vizier of Belgrade Hadji Mustafa Pasha, a trusted ally of Selim III, was murdered by Kučuk Alija. Alija was one of the four leading Dahijas, Janissary commanders who were opposed to the Sultan's reforms. This resulted in the Sanjak of Smederevo being ruled by these renegade janissaries independently from the Ottoman government. Several district chiefs were murdered in the Slaughter of the Knezes on February 4, 1804, by the renegade janissaries. This sparked the First Serbian Uprising (1804–13), the first phase of the Serbian Revolution. After the Pashalik of Belgrade fell back to the Ottoman rule, various acts of violence and confiscation of people's properties took place. Islamized Serbs and Albanians especially took part in such actions. Despite suppression of the uprising in 1813 and Hadži Prodan's Revolt in 1814, the Second Serbian Uprising led by Duke Miloš Obrenović succeeded with creation of semi-independent Principality of Serbia in 1817 (confirmed with Ferman from Mahmud II in 1830), gained independence in 1878 by Treaty of San Stefano and evolved to Kingdom of Serbia in 1882. This marked the end of the Sanjak.

Demographics
The Muslim population of Smederevo was composed of three main groups: local Muslim Serbs, Bosniaks and Albanians, who were the most significant non-Slavic group of the Smederevo region. These were mostly villagers, but also feudals, soldiers, officials, and some were among the highest social class, in the administration.

The proportion of Muslims was notably decreased in the late 17th and first half of the 18th century, after a major influx of Serbs (Christians) from outlying territories, mostly from Dinaric areas.

Economy
The Sanjak of Smederevo was one of six Ottoman sanjaks with most developed shipbuilding (besides sanjaks of Vidin, Nicopolis, Požega, Zvornik and Mohač).

Governors
Ali Bey Mihaloğlu (1462–1507)
Hadım Sinan Pasha (1507-1513)
Kučuk Bali-beg Jahjapašić (after 1521, before 1526)
Hadži Mustafa Pasha (1793–1801)
Bekir Pasha (1804)
Suleiman Pasha (1813–15)
Marashli Ali Pasha (1815–17)

Citations

Sources

 

 

 
 
Miljković-Bojanić, E. (2004) Smederevski sandžak - 1476-1560 - zemlja, naselja, stanovništvo. Beograd: Istorijski institut

External links

1459 establishments in the Ottoman Empire
Sanjaks of the Ottoman Empire in Europe
States and territories established in 1459
Ottoman Serbia
1817 disestablishments in the Ottoman Empire
States and territories disestablished in 1817